The  (Army March Collection), also known as the Prussian Army March Collection refers to the basic catalog of works of German military march music.

Origins
The basis for the creation of an extensive set of scores for military brass bands lies in a highest cabinet order of King Friedrich Wilhelm III of Prussia on 10 February 1817 requesting a selection of proven compositions for every regiment of infantry, cavalry and artillery:

Friedrich Wilhelm III's initial collection consisted of 36 slow marches and 36 quick marches for infantry.

This Army March Collection in time contained Prussian, Austrian and Russian marches, divided into three collections:

Collection I: Slow marches for infantry (115 marches)
Collection II: Parade (quick) marches for infantry (269 marches)
Collection III: Cavalry Marches (149 marches)

This was titled Collection of Marches and Fanfares for Trumpet-Music for the Use of the Prussian Cavalry.

All the marches incorporated into the army march collection have an official number including a Roman numeral designation (denoting collection) and an Arabic number (list number in the collection). Some well known examples:

"" (AM I, 1a und III, 1a)
"" (AM II, 198)
"" (AM III, 72)
"" (AM III, 1b)
"" (AM II, 195)
"" ("The Crusaders Fanfare") (AM III, 113)
"" (AM I, 100)
"" ("Finnish Cavalry March") (AM III, 70)
"" (AM II, 38)
"" (AM II, 113)
"" ("Prussia's Glory") (AM II, 240)
"" (AM II, 210)
"" (AM II, 103)

Austro-Hungarian list

On March 24, 1894, the Imperial and Royal War Ministry issued an order ( no. 1157) to create the publication of a standardized list of marches.  This order includes: "The Imperial War Ministry intends to revive and preserve the tradition of outstanding epochs in the history of our nation and army by compiling and publishing in uniform orchestrations the older historic marches which owe their fame to successes in war, as well as suitable marches that were dedicated to the memory of glorious regiments, famous generals, or regimental colonels-in-chief".

The official branch marches of the artillery ("" composer unknown) and navy ("" by ) plus one of the military academy marches ("" by ) were also included in the publication.

By February 1914 there were assigned marches for the four s as well as 102 Infantry Regiments.

New collection

Old and newly composed marches were incorporated. Marches of the former Royal Prussian, Royal Bavarian, Royal Saxon, and Royal Württemberg Armies were now merged into one collection, alongside those of the lower ranking states of the former Empire. Preparation of this collection ended in 1945. It was now divided into four subgroups:

Collection I: Presentation Marches for infantry (8 marches)
Collection II: Parade marches for infantry (38 marches)
Collection III: Cavalry marches in step (slow pace) (17 marches)
Collection IIIB: Cavalry marches in canter (fast pace) (83 marches)

The collection continued to grow and be divided into new distinct groups:

Collection I: Slow Marches for the infantry
Collection II: Quick Marches for the infantry
Collection III: Marches for Mounted Troops (cavalry) and field artillery
Collection IV: Miscellaneous Marches

Group IV was added in 1929 and included two subdivisions:

Collection IVa: Marches of  quality and character of importance to particular regiments of the individual German states
Collection IVb: Marches for fifes and drums of the Royal Prussian Army regiments of 1806

Marches infrequently performed were eliminated and marches of Saxony were added. Trots and gallops were added which caused Collection III to be divided into IIIa slow marches and IIIb trots and gallops. The  was denoted as HM (and also VDHM, for ).

Some marches are noted as in both the AM and HM collections:

"" (AM II, 240 and HM II, 98)
"" (AM II, 103, and HM II, 5)

Two famous marches newly added in the revised numbering scheme:

"" (HM II, 150)
"" (HM II, 256)

Reasons for their lack of inclusion are several: These composers not being in military service in their most productive years, their marches considered more suitable to concert rather than parade use, and finally their marches considered more technically difficult than those adopted for either the AM or HM collections.

Collection I: Parade Marches for Infantry (19 Marches)
Collection I: Slow Marches for Infantry (11 marches)
Collection I: Parade Marches for Mounted Troops (17 marches)
Collection I: Tattoos (4)
Collection I: Appendix (2 marches)
Collection II: Parade Marches for Infantry (64 marches)
Collection III: Parade Marches at the Trot and Canter (35 marches)

The marches in Collection I are numbered 1-53, in Collection II 101-164, and in Collection III 201-235, for a total of 152 marches.

The German Wikipedia article on the  includes a comprehensive list based on ’s work :de:Armeemarschsammlung.

World War II-era marches

The only Luftwaffe march incorporated into the collection was 's "" HM II, 143 (added in 1933).  's march had won a competition in 1932 for army marches.   (Chief of Music for the Air Force 13 August 1936 – 1945)  chose "" as  no. 47 for a collection of marches suitable for the new air force.  At the same time,  and  created a  containing approved national hymns and song adapted to marches plus a new set of marches for military bands.

Given the expansion of the fleet begun in 1890 under Kaiser Wilhelm II, "" was often used as a greeting to ships entering and exiting the port of Kiel.

Post-World War II status
Many works from the older AM collection are missing original editions or are fragmentary. Some of the composers of the marches are unknown. The destruction of the Prussian State Archives in Potsdam in 1945 is partly to blame.

Discography
These include:
 conducted by Wilhelm Stephan.
. A collection of 124 marches which derive from the long playing record era including marches from Prussia, Hanover, Hesse, Bavaria, and Saxony.
.
Conductor: .
. TS 3276 (2 LPs)  . German cavalry marches and songs, 1928-1941 (CD) Brandenburg Historica BH0934 1928-1943 (CD) Brandenburg Historica BH0914 Music of the Imperial German Navy 1907-1917 (CD) Brandenburg Historica BH0918. Military and Patriotic Music of Imperial Germany, 1903-1917 (CD)  Brandenburg Historica BH0901

Further reading
 “Printed Editions of Music for Brass Bands and Military Bands by German and Austrian Publishers in the Second Half of the Nineteenth Century” in Brass Scholarship in Review: Proceedings of the Historic Brass Society. Pendragon Press, 2006, p. 171-185. .
Heilman, Jason Stephen.  : Patriotic Music and Multinational Identity in the Austro-Hungarian Empire.  Duke University Department of Music dissertation, 2009. .
. .
Rehrig, William H.  The Heritage Encyclopedia of Band Music: Composers and Their Music''.  Vol.2.  Westerville, Ohio: Integrity Press, 1991, p. 873-874. .
.  .  /.: , 1999. .
Toeche-Mittler, Joachim.  . , . . 3 volumes:
Vol I. "".  1966.
Vol II. "".  1971.
Vol III. "".  1975.

German military marches